Kennedy, with variant forms O'Kennedy and Kennedie, is a surname of Irish and Scottish origin that has also been used as a given name.

Origins
There have been several different etymologies given for the surname. One is that the name is an Anglicisation of Ó Cinnéide, meaning "grandson of Cinnédidh" or "grandson of Cinnéidigh", with both of these personal names meaning "helmet headed." Ceanéidigh could be related to the old Gaelic name Cennétig, which is known from Cennétig mac Lorcáin, the father of the Irish high king Brian mac Cennétig, who himself was also known as Brian Bóruma or Brian Boru. There are also an Irish Kennedy family and a Scottish Kennedy clan of Carrick in Ayrshire, which are unrelated to one another. Another possibility is that Kennedy is an Anglicisation of the Gaelic Ó Ceannéidigh meaning "grandson of Ceannéidigh". Ceannéidigh is a given name derived from the Gaelic words ceann, meaning "head", and éidigh, meaning "ugly" or "fierce". In some etymologies, the element ceann is given as "chief" or "leader".

Name lists
Alan Kennedy, several people
Andrew Kennedy, several people
Arthur Kennedy, several people
Jack Kennedy, several people
James Kennedy, several people
John Kennedy, several people
Joseph Kennedy, several people
Kathleen Kennedy, several people
Les Kennedy, several people
Martin Kennedy, several people
Matthew Kennedy, several people
Patrick Kennedy, several people
Paul Kennedy, several people
Robert Kennedy, several people
Rose Kennedy, several people
Terry Kennedy, several people
Thomas Kennedy, several people
Walter Kennedy, several people

In arts and entertainment
A. L. Kennedy (Alison Louise Kennedy, born 1965), Scottish novelist
Adam Kennedy (actor) (1922–1997), American actor, screenwriter, novelist, painter
Alexis Kennedy (born 1972), British writer and game designer
Andrew Karpati Kennedy (1931–2016), Hungarian-born British author, literary critic and academic
Arthur Kennedy (actor) (1914–1990), American actor
Betty Kennedy, retired Canadian senator, television personality
Bill Kennedy (actor) (1908–1997), American actor and television personality
Cory Kennedy (model), American Internet celebrity
Darren Kennedy, Irish television presenter, fashion writer and stylist
Dermot Kennedy (born 1992), Irish singer-songwriter 
Douglas Kennedy, UK-based American novelist
Edgar Kennedy (1890–1948), American actor
George Kennedy (1925–2016), American actor
Graeme K. (Graeme Kennedy), American musician
Graham Kennedy, Australian comedian and television presenter
Harrison Kennedy (musician) (born 1942), Canadian blues, R&B, and soul blues musician
Jane Kennedy (actress) (born 1964), Australian actress
Jamie Kennedy, American comedian and actor
Jon Kennedy, British drummer and electronic musician
Kathleen Kennedy (producer) (born 1953), American film producer
Lena Kennedy, English romantic novelist
Leon S. Kennedy, frequent character in the Resident Evil franchise
Les Kennedy (journalist) (1958–2011), Australian journalist
Lisa Kennedy Montgomery (born 1972), stage name Kennedy, American political satirist and former MTV VJ
Liza Kennedy (born 1989), Japanese model
Lucy Napaljarri Kennedy, Indigenous Australian artist
Ludovic Kennedy, British journalist, broadcaster, and author
Margaret Kennedy (1896–1967), English novelist
Martha Kennedy (born 1951), American curator at the Library of Congress
Mary Kennedy, Irish television personality
Merna Kennedy (1908–1944), American actress
Michael Kennedy (1926–2014), English music critic
Mr. Kennedy, the ring name used by American professional wrestler Ken Anderson (born 1976) during his time in WWE
Mimi Kennedy (born 1948), American actress, author, and activist
Myles Kennedy (born 1969), American rock singer and guitarist
Nigel Kennedy, English violinist
Patrick Kennedy, British theatre director
Roisin Kennedy, Irish art critic and curator
Sarah Kennedy, British television and radio broadcaster
Sean J. Kennedy, American drumset player, percussionist, author and educator
Sheila Kennedy, American model and actress, Penthouse model in the early 1980s
 Sheila Kennedy (architect), American architect
Tom Kennedy (television presenter) (1927–2020), stage name of American game show host James Narz
William Kennedy (author) (born 1928), American writer and journalist
William J. Kennedy, American writer, winner of the 1984 Pulitzer Prize for fiction

In politics and government

Members of the US Kennedy political family

Caroline Kennedy (born 1957), attorney; daughter of John and Jacqueline Kennedy
Edward "Ted" Kennedy (1932–2009), senior US senator from Massachusetts, married twice and father of three
Ethel Kennedy (born 1928), widow of Robert Francis Kennedy and mother of Joseph Patrick Kennedy II, Robert Francis Kennedy Jr. and other nine
Eunice Kennedy Shriver (1921–2009), sister of President John F. Kennedy; wife of Robert Sargent Shriver Jr.
Jacqueline Kennedy Onassis (1929–1994), First Lady of the United States; widow of John F. Kennedy
Jean Kennedy Smith (1928-2020), ambassador to Ireland; sister of President John F. Kennedy
John F. Kennedy (1917–1963), 35th president of the United States
John F. Kennedy Jr. (1960–1999), attorney, publisher; son of John and Jacqueline
Joseph P. Kennedy Sr. (1888–1969), Ambassador to the United Kingdom; father of President John F. Kennedy
Joseph P. Kennedy Jr. (1915–1944), WWII pilot; eldest son of Joseph P. Kennedy Sr.
Joseph P. Kennedy II (born 1952), US representative from Massachusetts; son of Robert F. Kennedy
Kathleen Cavendish, Marchioness of Hartington (1920–1948), widow of the heir to the Devonshire dukedom; sister of President John F. Kennedy
Mary Richardson Kennedy (1959–2012), architect and wife of Robert F. Kennedy Jr.
Patrick J. Kennedy (born 1967), US representative from Rhode Island, son of Ted Kennedy
Patricia Kennedy Lawford (1924–2006), sister of president John F. Kennedy, wife of Peter Lawford and mother of four
Robert F. Kennedy (1925–1968), US senator from New York; US Attorney General
Robert F. Kennedy Jr. (born 1954), attorney, environmentalist, activist
Rose Kennedy (1890–1995), Kennedy family matriarch; mother of President John F. Kennedy
Rosemary Kennedy (1918–2005), oldest sister of President John F. Kennedy

Other Kennedys involved in politics
Alfred J. Kennedy (1877–1944), New York politician
Ambrose Jerome Kennedy, American politician
Anthony Kennedy, US Supreme Court Associate Justice
Arthur Kennedy, British colonial administrator
Betty Kennedy, retired Canadian senator, television personality
Cary Kennedy, Colorado politician
Charles Kennedy (1959–2015), Scottish politician, leader of the Liberal Democrats
Claudia J. Kennedy, first female lieutenant general in the US Army, noted intelligence officer
David Kennedy (Australian politician) (born 1940), Australian politician
David M. Kennedy (politician), 60th Secretary of the Treasury of the United States of America, and US Ambassador to NATO
Edward Joseph Kennedy (born 1851), Irish nationalist politician, Member of Parliament for South Sligo
Gerard Kennedy, Canadian politician
Helena Kennedy, Baroness Kennedy of The Shaws, Scottish barrister, writer and politician
Hiram Raleigh Kennedy, American politician
John Neely Kennedy, Louisiana United States Senator and Republican politician
John Pendleton Kennedy (1795–1870), Maryland author and politician, Secretary of the Navy in the Filmore administration 
Judy Kennedy, New York state politician
Leland T. Kennedy, US Air Force pilot twice awarded the Air Force Cross
Mark Kennedy, British undercover policeman
Mark Kennedy, American politician
Neil Kennedy, Lord Kennedy (1854–1918), Scottish advocate and legal academic, Chairman of the Scottish Land Court 1912–18
Nigel Kennedy (politician) (1889–1964), British barrister, army officer and politician
Sir Paul Kennedy, British judge
Seema Kennedy (born 1974), British Conservative Party politician, Member of Parliament (MP) for South Ribble since May 2015
Sheryl Kennedy, American politician
Thomas Laird Kennedy, Premier of Ontario (1948–1949)
Vincent P. Kennedy  (1824-1903), American physician and politician
Sir William Rann Kennedy, British judge (1846–1915)

In sports
Adam Kennedy (born 1976), American professional baseball player
Alan Kennedy (born 1954), English footballer
Alanna Kennedy (born 1995), Australian association footballer
Allan Kennedy (born 1958), Canadian-born American football player
Andrew Kennedy (born 1965), American-Jamaican basketball player, 1996 Israeli Basketball Premier League MVP
Ben Kennedy, Australian rugby league footballer
Bob Kennedy (1920–2005), Major League Baseball player and manager
Bob Kennedy (1921–2010), American football player
Bob Kennedy (1928–1991), American football player
Bob Kennedy (born 1970), distance runner
Brad Kennedy (born 1974), Australian golfer
Buddy Kennedy (born 1998), American baseball player
Callum Kennedy, English footballer
Clem Kennedy, Australian rugby league footballer
Cortez Kennedy (1968–2017), American football player
Cory Kennedy (skateboarder), American professional skateboarder
Courtney Kennedy (1979), American dual Olympic medal winner in women's ice hockey
Dave Kennedy (footballer) (born 1949), English footballer
David Kennedy (racing driver) (born 1953), Irish racing driver
Dean Kennedy (born 1963), Canadian ice hockey player
Edward Shirley Kennedy, British alpinist
Fred Kennedy (1902–1963), English football player
Gilbert G. Kennedy (1844–1909), Scottish footballer
Goo Kennedy (1949–2020), American basketball player
Ian Kennedy (born 1984), American baseball player
Jeremy Kennedy, UFC Fighter
Jim Kennedy, American baseball player, brother of Junior Kennedy
Jon Kennedy (born 1995), Australian professional baseball player
Joshua Kennedy, Australian soccer player
Junior Kennedy, American baseball player, brother of Jim Kennedy
Kenneth Kennedy, the first Winter Olympian for Australia
Kevin Kennedy (baseball) (born 1954), American baseball manager and broadcaster
Marcus Kennedy, American basketball player
Mark Kennedy, Irish football (soccer) player
Mike Kennedy, American college baseball coach
Nery Kennedy, Paraguayan javelin thrower
Nick Kennedy, English rugby player
Pat Kennedy, American college basketball coach
Patrick Kennedy (swimmer) (born 1964), American swimmer
Ray Kennedy (1951–2021), English footballer
Ron Kennedy (1953–2009), Canadian ice hockey player
Ryan Kennedy (born 1982), Canadian actor and model
Stewart Kennedy (born 1946), Scottish Football Player 
Ted Kennedy (ice hockey) (1925–2009), Canadian ice hockey player
Tim Kennedy, American mixed martial arts fighter
Tim Kennedy, American ice hockey player

In other fields
Adrian Kennedy, Irish radio host
Alexander Kennedy, British civil engineer
Benjamin Hall Kennedy, English classical scholar
Bernard Kennedy, Irish psychoanalyst, poet, and priest
Betty Ann Kennedy, American bridge player
D. James Kennedy, American Presbyterian pastor and theologian
Diane Kennedy, American CPA, speaker, financial writer
Donald Kennedy, American scientist, public administrator, and academic
Duncan Kennedy, Carter Professor of General Jurisprudence, Harvard Law School
Edmund Kennedy (1818–1848), Australian explorer
Edmund P. Kennedy (1785–1844), officer in United States Navy
Edward Kennedy (c. 1905 – 1963), American journalist who first reported the German surrender in World War II
Edward Stewart Kennedy (1912–2009), American historian of science
George Clayton Kennedy (1919–1980), American botanist
Gillian Dorothy Kennedy, British speech and language therapist
Ian Kennedy, Irish landscape architect
 Inga Kennedy (born 1962), Scottish nurse and senior Royal Navy officer
Jennie E. Kennedy, American suffragist
Joseph W. Kennedy, American physicist
Jonny Kennedy, subject of the documentary The Boy Whose Skin Fell Off
Julia Kennedy, British classical scholar
Julian Kennedy, American engineer and inventor
Kathryn Kennedy, California wine maker
Margrit Kennedy, German architect and author
Marion Kennedy, British classical scholar
Marvin G. Kennedy, United States Navy submarine commander in World War II
Myles Burton Kennedy, Furness ironmaster
Paul Kennedy, British historian of international relations
Rita Shugart,  Kennedy, American bridge player
Robert Cobb Kennedy (1835–1865), Confederate operative who attempted to burn down New York City
Stetson Kennedy (1916–2011), American human rights activist and folklore collector
Thomas Francis Kennedy (bishop) (1858–1917), American Catholic archbishop

See also
Clan Kennedy of Scotland
Marquess of Ailsa, held by the chief of the Clan Kennedy
Kennedy family of Ireland
Kennedy (given name)
Kennedy (disambiguation)
Jasmine Kennedie
O'Kennedy

References

External links 
 

Anglicised Irish-language surnames
Celtic-language surnames
Surnames
Surnames of Irish origin
Surnames of Scottish origin
English-language surnames